Oops! Wrong Planet is the third studio album by American rock band  Utopia. It delivers a markedly trimmed down, pop-oriented direction for the band following the progressively influenced previous album, Ra.

Oops! peaked at #77 on the Billboard album chart in 1977.

"Love is the Answer" later became a hit for England Dan & John Ford Coley, charting #1 on the Billboard Adult Contemporary list in 1979.

Track listing

Personnel
Todd Rundgren - guitars, lead (1, 3, 6, 10-12) and backing vocals, saxophone (10)
Roger Powell - keyboards, lead (2, 8) and backing vocals, trumpet (8), Powell probe
Kasim Sulton - bass, lead (1, 5-7, 10) and backing vocals
John "Willie" Wilcox - drums, lead (4, 9) and backing vocals

Engineered and produced by Rundgren

Charts
Album - Billboard

References

1977 albums
Todd Rundgren albums
Albums produced by Todd Rundgren
Utopia (band) albums
Bearsville Records albums
Rhino Records albums